Michel Riccio (1445–1515) was an Italian-born French lawyer, public official and historian. He was known in Italian also as Michele Riccio / Rizzo or Ricci, in Latin Michael Ritius, and in the French form Michel de Ris or de Rys.

Biography

Early life
Michel Riccio was born in 1445 in Naples, Italy.

Career
He started his career as a lawyer under Ferdinand I of Naples (1423–1494). He moved to France under the reign of King Charles VIII of France (1470–1498), for whom he served as an Advisor. In 1495, he served in the Parliament of Dijon, also known as the Parliament of Bourgogne. In 1498, King Louis XII of France (1462–1515) appointed him Senator of Milan.

From 1501 to 1502, he served as the first President of the Parliament of Aix-en-Provence. However, he was soon replaced by Antoine Mulet.

In 1505, Pope Julius II (1443–1513) sent him on a mission in Rome. The following year, in 1506, King Louis XII sent him to Genoa to put an end to a local revolt, to no avail.

As a historian, he wrote volumes about the Italian Wars and the dynastic rulers of the Kingdom of Naples.

Death
He died in 1515.
The ashes of the historian are kept in the funeral chapel of the family Riccio / Rizzo / Ritius in the basilica of San Domenico Maggiore in Naples. Naples. A commemorative epigraph is still visible on the funeral monument.

Bibliography
 Historia profectionis Caroli VIII (1496)
 Traité du devoir des gens de guerre et de leurs privilèges (1505)
 Defensoria oratio pro Ludovico XII (1506)
 De regibus Francorum libri III
 De regibus Hispaniæ libri III
 De regibus Hierosolymorum liber I
 De regibus Neapolis et Siciliæ libri IV
 De regibus Ungariæ libri II

References

1445 births
1515 deaths
15th-century Neapolitan people
Lawyers from Milan
People from Aix-en-Provence
Politicians from Dijon
Italian emigrants to France
15th-century Italian historians
16th-century Neapolitan people
Writers from Milan
16th-century Italian historians